Eleones, meaning in Greek olive-groves, is a neighbourhood of Pylaia, Greece, a suburb of Thessaloniki.

Located on the edge of a forest, it is the location of multiple private schools and many residences.

The Greek Society for the Protection and Assistance of Disabled Children (ELEPAAP, Ελληνική Εταιρία Προστασίας και Αποκατάστασης Ανάπηρων Παιδιών - ΕΛΕΠΑΑΠ), a school for disabled children is there.

Although its name results from olive-groves that were once in abundance in the area, very few olive trees can be found there today.

Populated places in Thessaloniki (regional unit)